Les J3 (also known as The J3) is a 1946 French film directed by Roger Richebé, and adapted from the play by the same name, written by Roger Ferdinand. The film's admissions in France were 2,748,441.

Plot synopsis
The play focuses on a group of high school students in occupied France during the Second World War. Whilst the students are initially more focused on the black market trade of cigarettes and stockings, a new philosophy teacher, the "charming and gifted educator" Mademoiselle Bravard, focuses them back onto their work at school, helping them all pass their final exams.

Cast
 Gèrard Nery as Gabriel Lamy
 Gisèle Pascal as Mademoiselle Bravard
 Saturnin Fabre as the school Headmaster

References

External links
Les J3 at IMDb

1946 films
French films based on plays
Films with screenplays by Jean Aurenche
French comedy films
1946 comedy films
1940s French-language films
Films directed by Roger Richebé
French black-and-white films
1940s French films